Lou Grant is an American television drama series created by James L. Brooks, Allan Burns and Gene Reynolds and produced by MTM Productions. The show originally aired in the United States on CBS between September 20, 1977 and September 12, 1982, with 114 episodes split over five seasons. A spin off of the 1970s comedy series The Mary Tyler Moore Show, the series follows Lou Grant, played by Ed Asner, as he moves to Los Angeles to work as city editor for the fictional Los Angeles Tribune.

Lou Grant garnered acclaim and amassed 99 nominations for various industry awards, winning 27 awards. This includes 56 Emmy Awards (with 13 wins), 12 Golden Globe Awards (with 3 wins), 5 Directors Guild of America Awards (with 3 wins), and 14 Writers Guild of America Awards (with 2 wins). Asner and Nancy Marchand won the most awards for their performances in the series, with Asner winning 2 Emmy Awards and 2 Golden Globe Awards while Marchand won 4 Emmy Awards for Outstanding Supporting Actress.

Awards and nominations

ACE Eddie Awards
The Eddie Award is an annual accolade that was created by American Cinema Editors in 1962 to award outstanding achievements in editing in television and film. Lou Grant won an award from four nominations for Best Edited Episode from a Television Series.

Broadcasting Press Guild Awards
The Broadcasting Press Guild Awards is an annual accolade awarded by the Broadcasting Press Guild that recognizes "outstanding programmes and performances seen or heard in the preceding year." Lou Grant received the award for Best Imported Programme in 1979.

Directors Guild of America Awards
The Directors Guild of America Award, presented by the Directors Guild of America, is an annual accolade that honors excellence among directors in film and television. Lou Grant received 5 nominations, winning three awards for Outstanding Directorial Achievement in Drama Series.

Emmy Awards

Presented by the Academy of Television Arts & Sciences since 1949, the Primetime Emmy Award is an annual accolade that honors outstanding achievements in various aspects of television such as acting, directing and writing. Lou Grant received 56 nominations, winning 13 awards, including four awards for Outstanding Continuing Performance by a Supporting Actress in a Drama Series (Nancy Marchand), two awards for Outstanding Drama Series, two awards for Outstanding Lead Actor in a Drama Series (Ed Asner), two awards for Outstanding Writing in a Drama Series, an award for Outstanding Lead Actor for a Single Appearance in a Drama or Comedy Series, an award for Outstanding Directing in a Drama Series (Roger Young), and an award for Outstanding Music Composition for a Series (Dramatic Underscore) (Patrick Williams).

Primetime Emmy Awards

Creative Arts Emmy Awards

Golden Globe Awards
The Golden Globe Award is an annual accolade presented by the Hollywood Foreign Press Association (HFPA) which honors the best performances in television and film. Lou Grant received 12 nominations, winning three awards – two for Best Actor – Television Series Drama (Ed Asner) and one for Best Television Series – Drama.

Golden Reel Awards
The Golden Reel Award is an annual award presented by the Motion Picture Sound Editors (MPSE) in recognition of sound editors in film and television. Lou Grant won an award for Television One Hour Series: Sound Editing.

Edgar Awards
The Edgar Awards, presented by the Mystery Writers of America since 1946, recognizes the best in mystery fiction, non-fiction, television, film, and theater. Lou Grant received a nomination for Best Television Episode.

Humanitas Prize
Awarded since 1974, the Humanitas Prize is an annual accolade that recognizes outstanding achievement of writers in film and television whose work promotes human dignity, meaning and freedom. Receiving four nominations for the 60 Minute Category, Lou Grant received two awards.

Peabody Awards
Awarded since 1940, the Peabody Award, named after American banker and philanthropist George Peabody, is an annual award the recognizes excellence in storytelling across mediums including television, radio, television networks, and online videos. Lou Grant won in 1978, with the board praising Ed Asner's portrayal of the titular character as well as the cast and crew.

Writers Guild of America Awards
The Writers Guild of America Award, presented by the Writers Guild of America, is an annual accolade that honors excellence among writers in film, television, radio, promotional writing and videogames. Lou Grant received 14 nominations, winning two awards for Television: Episodic Drama.

References

External links
 List of Primetime Emmy Awards received by Lou Grant
 List of awards and nominations received by Lou Grant at the Internet Movie Database

Lou Grant